Borough of Richmond or Richmond Borough may refer to:

Former name of the Borough of Staten Island in New York City, New York, US
Municipal Borough of Richmond (Surrey), England, UK
London Borough of Richmond upon Thames, its successor
Municipal Borough of Richmond, Yorkshire, England, UK; which was merged into Richmondshire, North Yorkshire
Richmond Borough, New Zealand (1891–1989), borough for the town of Richmond, New Zealand

See also

 
 
 Richmond (disambiguation)